"Shut Down" is the first single released by Australian rock band Australian Crawl from their third studio album Sons of Beaches. The song was written by drummer Bill McDonough and features lead vocals by James Reyne. The B-side was the non-album track "Creating Monsters". It was produced by Mike Chapman.

"Shut Down" was released in June 1982 and reached #17 on the Australian Singles Chart in 1982.

Track listing
"Shut Down" (Bill McDonough) - 4:11
"Creating Monsters" (James Reyne)

Charts

References

1982 songs
Australian Crawl songs
Song recordings produced by Mike Chapman